Macrobrochis nigripes is a moth of the subfamily Arctiinae. It was described by George Hampson in 1900. It is found in the Indian states of Sikkim and Assam.

References

Lithosiina
Moths described in 1900